Marcus Shane Garrett (born November 16, 1967) is a former American football wide receiver who played one season with the Cincinnati Bengals. He played college football at Texas A&M.

Early life 
Garrett was born on November 16, 1967, in Lafayette, Louisiana. He grew up in Crowley, Louisiana, attending Crowley High School and playing as a wide receiver on the school's football team. He was a member of Louisiana's Super Dozen class of 1987.

College career 
Garrett played for the Texas A&M Aggies from 1988 to 1990, making 35 catches for 696 yards and five receiving touchdowns. He also scored one rushing touchdown and saw action as a kick returner.

NFL career 
Garrett was selected in the ninth round of the 1991 NFL Draft by the Cincinnati Bengals. He played in four games with the team in 1991, mostly as a kick and punt returner, though he also made three receptions for 32 yards at wide receiver.

He was put on injured reserve on August 14, 1992, and released on February 12, 1993.

References 

1967 births
Living people
American football wide receivers
Cincinnati Bengals players
Sportspeople from Lafayette, Louisiana
Players of American football from Louisiana
Texas A&M Aggies football players